Enantiola is a genus of beetles in the family Cicindelidae, containing the following species:

 Enantiola denticollis (W. Horn, 1895)
 Enantiola hewitti (W. Horn, 1908)
 Enantiola spinicollis (W. Horn, 1908)
 Enantiola wallacei (Bates, 1874)

References

Cicindelidae